Creative Orchestra (Köln) 1978 is a live album by American composer and saxophonist Anthony Braxton. Recorded in Germany in 1978 but not released on the hatART label until 1995, the album features a live concert featuring several of Braxton's compositions that were first recorded on Creative Orchestra Music 1976.

Reception

The Allmusic review by Scott Yanow awarded the album 4½ stars stating "The music is often dense and atonal but never dull, and the closing composition is a superb piece that displays Braxton's love of marching band music! Although one wishes that Anthony Braxton himself had played, this is a set easily recommended to his fans". On All About Jazz Jeff Stockton said "Those curious about Braxton but discouraged by the sheer number of recordings available may find this the place to start. Most of Braxton's work falls into two categories—more difficult and less difficult—but these 100 minutes of music are decidedly in the latter category. Braxton is among a handful of jazz composers whose music is part of the graduate-level course in the avant-garde" and Troy Collins noted "Creative Orchestra (Koln) 1978 is an endlessly intriguing concert recording that warrants repeated spins, offering new surprises with each listen".

Track listing
All compositions by Anthony Braxton

Disc one
 "Language Improvisations" - 14:34
 "Composition 55" - 12:27
 "Composition 45" - 25:21

Disc two
 "Composition 59" - 21:45
 "Composition 51" - 17:19
 "Composition 58" - 12:56

Personnel
Anthony Braxton - conductor
Dwight Andrews, Marty Ehrlich, Vinny Golia, J. D. Parran, Ned Rothenberg - saxophones, clarinets, flutes, piccolo
Rob Howard, Michael Mossman, Leo Smith, Kenny Wheeler - trumpet
Ray Anderson, George E. Lewis, James King Roosa - trombones, tuba
Marilyn Crispell - piano
Birgit Taubhorn - accordion
Bobby Naughton - vibraphone
James Emery - electric guitar
John Lindberg, Brian Smith - bass
Thurman Barker - percussion, marimba
Robert Ostertag - synthesizer

References

Hathut Records live albums
Anthony Braxton live albums
1995 live albums